Vadali is a village in Penugonda Mandal in West Godavari District of the Indian state of Andhra Pradesh.

Demographics

Telugu is the local language. The population of Vadali is 5,613, with 
2,825 males and 2,788 females living in 1451 Households. 

Villages in West Godavari district